USS Minnesota (SSN-783) is a nuclear powered fast attack submarine, the 10th of the . She is the third United States Navy vessel to bear the name and the second of two named for the state, while the other was named for the Minnesota River.

Minnesota was laid down on 20 May 2011, and christened on 27 October 2012 in a ceremony attended by many top ranking officials in the U.S. Navy and Congress.

On 6 June 2013, Huntington Ingalls Industries announced that Minnesota had been delivered to the Navy, nearly 11 months ahead of schedule. Minnesota was commissioned on 7 September 2013.

After commissioning, Minnesota remained at the General Dynamics Electric Boat shipyards in Groton, CT for over two years. A broken pipe joint was discovered in the vessel's nuclear reactor. The pipe had been tampered with in order to make the part appear within specifications. Although a failure of the pipe would not result in a reactor incident, it would affect the reactor's ability to produce steam used for propulsion. The same issue has been discovered on two other boats in the class. A Navy investigation determined that two other ships had the same issue, and the U.S. Justice Department commenced an investigation of the contractor responsible for the defective parts.

On 27 May 2016, Minnesota left the Electric Boat shipyards for her home port, Naval Submarine Base New London in Groton, Connecticut, to prepare for fleet operations.

On 17 March 2022, Minnesota arrived at her new home port, Joint Base Pearl Harbor–Hickam.

References

External links

 Huntington Ingalls' web page re the Minnesota.

Nuclear submarines of the United States Navy
Submarines of the United States
Virginia-class submarines